The 2nd constituency of Paris (French: Deuxième circonscription de Paris) is a French legislative constituency in the department of Paris. Like the other 576 French constituencies, it elects one member of the National Assembly using the two-round system. Its boundaries were heavily redrawn in 1988 and 2012. From 1958 until 1988 it was located on the Rive Droite; since then it has been located on the Rive Gauche. In the 2017 legislative election, Gilles Le Gendre of La République En Marche! (LREM) won a majority of the vote. He succeeded former Prime Minister François Fillon who did not seek reelection.

Deputies

Election results

2022

 
 
 
 
 
 
 
|-
| colspan="8" bgcolor="#E9E9E9"|
|-

2017

 
 
 
 
 
 
 
 
|-
| colspan="8" bgcolor="#E9E9E9"|
|-

2012

2007
Elections between 1988 and 2007 were based on the 1988 boundaries.

 
 
 
 
 
|-
| colspan="8" bgcolor="#E9E9E9"|
|-

2002

 
 
 
 
 
|-
| colspan="8" bgcolor="#E9E9E9"|
|-

1997

 
 
 
 
 
 
 
 
|-
| colspan="8" bgcolor="#E9E9E9"|
|-

References

External links
Results of legislative elections since 1958

2